Hobsonville is a suburb in West Auckland, in the North Island of New Zealand. The area was administered by Waitakere City Council until the council was amalgamated into Auckland Council in 2010.

Hobsonville Point, formerly the location of the Royal New Zealand Air Force's RNZAF Station Hobsonville, a fully operational air base, is now a residential suburb of Auckland. The peninsula is joined by the State Highway 16 in the west and the Upper Harbour Bridge in the east.

History

Hobsonville was named after the first Governor of New Zealand, William Hobson. After landing by sea at the site, Hobson thought it suitable as the seat of Government for New Zealand but later rejected this on the advice of the Surveyor-General of New Zealand, Felton Matthew. After the signing of the Treaty of Waitangi, Okiato (renamed Russell), was chosen as the capital instead.

Originally Hobsonville was mainly an agricultural and horticultural area. The first European settler of the area, Rice Owen Clark, bought land in 1854. As the ground was too moist for farming Clark began focusing on developing the land for clay production. During the early history of Auckland, large clay and brickworks operated in the area such as in Limeburners Bay and at the Clark's Brickworks, to the south-east of Hobsonville along the shores of the Waitematā Harbour. Hobsonville was the centre for the heavy clay industry in Auckland between 1863 and 1929, specialising in glazed pottery, such as drain pipes, garden ornaments and household utensils. The brickworks' clay piping production was used to reticulate much of the new Auckland city centre, bringing in much of Clark's wealth.

Clark's Brickworks was located on the shore to the southwest of Bannings Way, with Clark himself living in 'Clark House', currently occupied by the RNZAF Aviation Medicine Unit, on Clark Road. Servants' quarters were located adjacent to the Hobsonville shopping centre and are in a design similar to Clark House, but single storeyed. The servants' quarters have subsequently been used as a Plunket Society facility and Day Care Centre. There are stories that these two buildings are connected by a tunnel to facilitate normal service requirements of the day, including cooking and maid service.

Much of the land however was not built upon during this time. In 1929, the clayworks closed, as the cost of transporting the dwindling clay resources from the area became too high. During the Great Depression, the West Auckland clay industries amalgamated, and were centralised at New Lynn. In 1920, the Royal New Zealand Air Force built RNZAF Station Hobsonville, covering a large part of what is now defined as the Hobsonville Corridor. Northern Hobsonville features many historical buildings from the 1920s and 1930s relating to the airfield, including officers' residences, barracks, and hangars which were used to house seaplanes and helicopters. 

From September 1938 a register of potential tradesmen and groundstaff for any necessary expansion of the RNZAF was begun. "The Munich crisis made it appear that war might break out at any time, and the scheme was put into effect immediately.. [t]he expansion of the RNZAF immediately before the war was so rapid that the Technical Training School at Hobsonville could not train sufficient fitters and riggers for the service."

The first 30 of an order of what was intended as over 100 North American P-51 Mustangs were delivered to New Zealand in August-September 1945. By this time, the Second World War was over, Japan having surrendered following the Atomic bombings of Hiroshima and Nagasaki. The Mustangs were deemed to be surplus to requirements and the remainder of the order was cancelled. However, the aircraft already in New Zealand could not be returned. They were duly placed on the RNZAF inventory as NZ2401 to NZ2430, but put into storage at Hobsonville. Later, they were moved to the stores depot at Te Rapa and then onto Ardmore. They were later issued in small numbers to the four regional fighter squadrons of the Territorial Air Force.

The station was administratively joined with the airfield at Whenuapai in 1965 to become RNZAF Base Auckland. Since 2001, the operations based in Hobsonville began to be relocated to other bases.

Redevelopment 

Near the end of the 20th century, residential areas sprang up at the fringes of the area, and rural farms became lifestyle blocks. The RNZAF sold the airfield back to the NZ Government (via Housing New Zealand) in 2002, although they retain a lease on much of the airfield. Since then, Waitakere City Council, in cooperation with various stakeholders, planned the future of the area, and proceeded through the requisite steps (such as District Plan changes) to rezone the land. This process, which involved making a total of 4 square kilometres of land available for development, was expected to finish in 2007. On the 1.67 km² of Crown land, about 3,000 homes were to be built (in addition to facilities such as parks and schools). Of the homes, 85% were to be privately owned, while around 15% were to be state housing social rentals financed by Housing New Zealand and dispersed throughout Hobsonville.

However, the setting aside of a good portion of land for state housing was criticised as an economic mistake by Opposition leader John Key, as this would lower land and house values in Hobsonville. After election as Prime Minister in 2008, Key removed the state housing requirements from Hobsonville Point and instead introduced a 'gateway housing' scheme to help first-time home buyers.

Work on housing began in 2011 with two schools and a marine industry cluster (boat & yacht building) also planned.

Demographics

Hobsonville had a population of 4,938 at the 2018 New Zealand census, an increase of 3,348 people (210.6%) since the 2013 census, and an increase of 3,330 people (207.1%) since the 2006 census. There were 1,812 households, comprising 2,367 males and 2,568 females, giving a sex ratio of 0.92 males per female, with 1,029 people (20.8%) aged under 15 years, 894 (18.1%) aged 15 to 29, 2,346 (47.5%) aged 30 to 64, and 669 (13.5%) aged 65 or older.

Ethnicities were 69.3% European/Pākehā, 5.4% Māori, 2.9% Pacific peoples, 28.2% Asian, and 3.5% other ethnicities. People may identify with more than one ethnicity.

The percentage of people born overseas was 41.3, compared with 27.1% nationally.

Although some people chose not to answer the census's question about religious affiliation, 55.4% had no religion, 34.4% were Christian, 0.1% had Māori religious beliefs, 1.5% were Hindu, 0.8% were Muslim, 1.2% were Buddhist and 1.6% had other religions.

Of those at least 15 years old, 1,593 (40.8%) people had a bachelor's or higher degree, and 339 (8.7%) people had no formal qualifications. 1,230 people (31.5%) earned over $70,000 compared to 17.2% nationally. The employment status of those at least 15 was that 2,295 (58.7%) people were employed full-time, 459 (11.7%) were part-time, and 102 (2.6%) were unemployed.

Economy
An area of 0.2 km² on Hobsonville Peninsula is to become a 'Marine Industry Cluster' for shipbuilding.  A super yacht builder is already occupying part of the headland, and it is hoped that this will become the nucleus of a local industry to provide up to 3,000 jobs. However, a later article in The New Zealand Herald stated that only 1,000 are expected to be created, though it also notes that in the meantime, three more boat building companies have already taken up residence in former aircraft hangars and old RNZAF buildings. The Marine Industry Association is pushing for the 'Marine Industry Cluster' zone change to safeguard these industries and allow further expansion.

Education
Hobsonville has four schools, three primary and one secondary:
Hobsonville School is a state full primary (Year 1–8) school with a roll of approximately  students.
Hobsonville Point Primary School is a state full primary (Year 1–8) school with a roll of approximately  students. Opened in February 2013, it was the first school in New Zealand constructed under a public–private partnership, with the school buildings constructed and managed by a private consortium.
Scott Point School is a state full primary (Year 1-8) school, which opened in temporary buildings in 2021, while the construction of the permanent school was still underway.
Hobsonville Point Secondary School is a state secondary (Year 9–13) school with a roll of approximately  students. Opened in February 2014, the school initially served only Year 9, adding years as the 2014 Year 9 cohort moved through. Like its primary counterpart, the school was constructed under a public–private partnership.
All these schools are coeducational.

Transportation 
The Upper Harbour Motorway, connecting the Greenhithe bridge to the end of the Northwestern Motorway, was completed in August 2011, thus taking a considerable amount of through traffic away from the main local road. As part of the Western Ring Route the motorway is intended to provide a faster link from the West to the North Auckland region. 

On 4 February 2013 a ferry service to downtown Auckland is due to start from a newly constructed terminal on Hobsonville Point. Initially the service will offer morning and evening commuter services only with an expected travel time of 30 minutes to and from Auckland. The suburb is served by three bus routes: 112, 114 and 120.

Tornadoes
In December 2012, a tornado swept through west Auckland, killing three people including two who died when concrete tilt slabs fell on a transport truck at a Hobsonville construction site. The tornado also damaged 150 homes. The centre of the tornado passed over a school being built at Hobsonville Point and tore off roofs in RNZAF housing.

RNZAF emergency response was activated, which included Base Medical staff, RNZAF Security Forces, NZDF Military Police, RNZAF Rescue Fire, and the RNZAF Civil Defence Response Group. The NZ Fire Service and NZ Police were also activated post–tornado.

References

External links

Hobsonville (Waitakere City Council website)
Hobsonville Land Company Limited (a Housing New Zealand subsidiary)
Photographs of Hobsonville held in Auckland Libraries' heritage collections.

Suburbs of Auckland
Upper Harbour Local Board Area
Populated places around the Waitematā Harbour
West Auckland, New Zealand